Chessie may refer to:

Chessie (sea monster), a legendary monster supposedly living in Chesapeake Bay, US
Chessie System, a former holding company of the Chesapeake and Ohio Railway (C&O)
Chessie (mascot), a kitten mascot of the C&O
Chessie (train), a proposed streamlined passenger train of the C&O
Chessie (band), an American experimental music group started in 1993
Chesapeake Bay Retriever, a breed of dog
Chessie Moo Moo A cute dog. Owned by Lexi